Liudmila Titova is an amateur ballet dancer.

Early life and dance training
Titova was born on October 9, 1987 in Moscow, Russia. At the age of ten she was admitted to the Bolshoi Ballet Academy. She trained at the academy for eight years, with a focus on "theatre of classical ballet".

Professional career
At the age of 19, Titova performed the lead role in Sergei Prokoviev's Cinderella. She went on to perform lead roles in other ballets, including The Nutcracker, Don Quixote, Giselle, Boléro, Carmen, Romeo and Juliet, Sleeping Beauty, Swan Lake, and The Time.

References

Russian ballerinas
1987 births
Living people
Dancers from Moscow